Thomas Eccleshare is an English playwright. He won the 2011 Verity Bargate Award for his debut play Pastoral.

He is also the founder and co-artistic director of Dancing Brick, a visual theatre company.

Work
Pastoral (2013) 
I'm Not Here Right Now (2015) 
Heather (2017)
Instructions for Correct Assembly (2018) Royal Court Theatre

References

English dramatists and playwrights
English male dramatists and playwrights
Year of birth missing (living people)
Living people